National Socialism most often refers to Nazism, the ideology of the Nazi Party, which ruled Nazi Germany from 1933 to 1945. The term "national socialism" was used by a number of unrelated groups before the Nazis, but since their rise to prominence it has become associated almost exclusively with their ideas.

National Socialism may also refer to:

Ethnic German movements related to Nazism (pre-1945) 
 Austrian National Socialism, an early influence on the NSDAP
 German National Socialist Workers' Party (Czechoslovakia) (Sudeten German, antisemitic)
 Sudeten German Party (Sudeten German, pro-annexation by Germany, successor of the above)
 Strasserism, a breakaway movement from German Nazism

Non-German movements related to Nazism (pre-1945) 

 National Socialist Bulgarian Workers Party (1930s)
 Canadian National Socialist Unity Party (pro-Anglo-Canadian/French-Canadian)
 National Socialist Movement of Chile (1930s)
 National Socialist Workers' Party of Denmark (German-style Nazi, antisemitic)
 Greek National Socialist Party (Italian-style fascist, pro-Hitler)
 Hungarian National Socialist Party (German-style Nazi, antisemitic)
 National Socialist Dutch Workers Party (1920s–1930s; favoured German annexation of the Netherlands)
 National Socialist Movement in the Netherlands (1930s–1940s; unlike the above, it nominally supported an independent Netherlands)
 National Socialist Workers' Party of Norway (German-style Nazi, antisemitic)
 Nasjonal Samling (Norwegian, German-style Nazi, anti-Semitic, anti-Masonic)
 National Socialist Party (Romania) (Romanian, German-style Nazi)
 Swedish National Socialist Farmers' and Workers' Party (pro-Hitler, founded in 1924)
 Swedish National Socialist Party (founded in 1930 through a merger of Nazi and fascist groups)
 National Socialist Workers' Party (Sweden) (split from the above in 1933, became more Strasserite and independently Swedish before declining during World War II)
 South African Gentile National Socialist Movement (1930s–1940s; pro-apartheid, white, antisemitic)

Neo-Nazism (after 1945) 
Neo-Nazism is a label for groups and ideologies after 1945 that are considered to be based on Nazism.

Australia
Australian National Socialist Party (founded 1962), merged into 
National Socialist Party of Australia (1968–1970s)
 National Socialist Network (contemporary)

UK
 National Socialist Action Party (British, founded in 1982, historical)
 National Socialist Movement (UK, 1962) (British, founded in 1962, historical)
 National Socialist Movement (United Kingdom) (British, contemporary)

US
 National Socialist League (United States) (American, gay, Aryan, pro-Hitler, historical)
 National Socialist Movement (United States) (American, contemporary)
 National Socialist Party of America (white, antisemitic, anti-black, historical)

Other countries

 Golden Dawn (Greece) (anti-Albania, anti-immigrants, islamophobic, contemporary)
 Iranian National Socialist Party (SUMKA), created in 1952 (pro-Hitler, antisemitic, anti-Arab, anti-Turk, historical)
 National Socialist Movement of Denmark (contemporary)
 National Socialist Movement of Norway (contemporary)
 National Socialist Party of New Zealand (German-style Nazi, anti-Semitic, historical)
 Russian National Socialist Party (Russian nationalist, fascist, anti-immigrant, contemporary)
 Social-National Party of Ukraine (Ukrainian nationalist, Ethnic nationalist, Anti-communist)
 Svoboda (political party) (Ukrainian nationalist, Ultranationalist, Right-wing populism)

Other unrelated ideologies and organizations 
Some of these were founded before the NSDAP and thus before "National Socialism" became associated with Nazism, while others exist in non-European contexts where Nazism is not widely known.
 Ba'ath Party, an Arab national-socialist party in Iraq and Syria
 Czech National Social Party, founded in Austria-Hungary in 1898 as a centre-left party advocating Czech independence. It used the name "Czechoslovak National Socialist Party" for a number of years in the early 20th century.
 Czech National Socialist Party, a small centre-left party which broke away from the above in 2005
 National-Social Association, a small centre-left Christian liberal party in Germany
 National Socialist Party (Jordan), a left-wing political party in Jordan that existed from 1954 to 1957
 National Socialist Party (Philippines), a political party founded in the Philippines in 1935
 National Socialist Party (UK), a breakaway group from the British Socialist Party formed in 1916
 Jatiya Samajtantrik Dal (National Socialist Party), a small socialist party in Bangladesh
 National Socialist Council of Nagaland, a Maoist insurgent group in India
 National Socialist Party of Tripura, a party advocating Tripuri self-determination in India
 Bernsteinism, originally called “revisionism”, the first example of a wider trend called by the same name. Lenin referred to it as "national socialism".

See also
Far-right politics
Far-right terrorism
Fascism